"Somebody Special" is a song by the Scottish singer-songwriter Nina Nesbitt. It was released on 11 January 2018 through Cooking Vinyl as the third single from her second studio album The Sun Will Come Up, the Seasons Will Change. The song was written by Nesbitt with Dan Muckala, who also produced it, and Brianna Kennedy.

Background and release
Written in Nashville, "Somebody Special" was premiered on 8 January 2018 during Zane Lowe's show on Beats 1.

The tracklist for Nina Nesbitt's second studio album The Sun Will Come Up, the Seasons Will Change was unveiled in October 2018. The standard edition of the album was released on 1 February 2019 and the deluxe edition, The Sun Will Come Up, the Seasons Will Change & The Flowers Will Fall, was released in November 2019. It includes an acoustic version of every song from the standard edition, including "Somebody Special".

Music video

The script for the "Somebody Special" music video was co-written by Nina Nesbitt.

Commercial performance
"Somebody Special" peaked at 89 on the UK Singles Chart. As of March 2021, it had amassed 47.7 millions of streams on Spotify.

Charts

References

2018 singles
2018 songs
Cooking Vinyl singles
Nina Nesbitt songs
Songs written by Dan Muckala
Song recordings produced by Dan Muckala